Kendriya Vidyalaya, Rayagada, (Hindi: केन्द्रीय विद्यालय) (Hindi for Central School) is a system of central government schools under the Ministry of Human Resource Development (India). It is run by Kendriya Vidyalaya Sangathan. It is located in Rayagada, Odisha, India.

History 
Kendriya Vidyalaya, Rayagada is a co-educational institution, run by Kendriya Vidyalaya Sangathan, an autonomous body under the Ministry of Human Resource Development. It was established in 2007. It started functioning in its office in Jeypore Sugar Factory Quarters at Rayagada from 28 February 2007. Presently the institution is functioning in its own campus located at Utkalmani Nagar, Jayaramguda from 8 September 2016, Rayagada. The school is affiliated with CBSE.
The school at Rayagada initially started with class from one to five from 2007, but later on it grew with class 10.

See also
 List of Kendriya Vidyalayas

References

External links
 

Kendriya Vidyalayas
Educational institutions established in 2007
2007 establishments in Orissa